There are six places called Alden Township in the United States: 

Alden Township, McHenry County, Illinois
Alden Township, Hardin County, Iowa
Alden Township, Freeborn County, Minnesota
Alden Township, St. Louis County, Minnesota
Alden Township, Hettinger County, North Dakota
Alden Township, Hand County, South Dakota

Township name disambiguation pages